Christopher Dibon (born 2 November 1990) is an Austrian professional footballer who plays as a defender for Austrian Bundesliga club Rapid Wien.

References

External links
 

Living people
1990 births
Austrian footballers
Association football defenders
Austria international footballers
Austrian Football Bundesliga players
FC Admira Wacker Mödling players
FC Red Bull Salzburg players
SK Rapid Wien players
People from Schwechat
Footballers from Lower Austria
Austrian people of French descent